Marquis of Baux is a subsidiary title of the Prince of Monaco. When possible, the title passes from the reigning Prince to the first male heir apparent or heir presumptive of the Monegasque throne. 

The present bearer of the title is Jacques, Hereditary Prince of Monaco. The marquisate was originally associated with the town of Les Baux de Provence, but later lost its administrative authority when control of the town reverted to France.

The title of "Lord of Baux" had been used by other families previously. King Louis XIII of France re-granted the lordship as a marquisate to Honoré II, Prince of Monaco, by the Treaty of Péronne on 14 September 1641. The new title was first used by Honoré's only son, Ercole, Marquis of Baux. Ercole died before his father, and thus the title has been granted for several centuries to the heirs of the Prince of Monaco.

List of titleholders

See also
 Lords of Baux
 Hereditary Prince of Monaco

References

Monegasque titles
Marquesses of Baux